Palante el Mambo! is the second studio album by Diego Gutiérrez. He recreates in this album Cuban genres and rhythms from a very personal vision of songwriting, which earned him immediate attention from critics and audiences. It was nominated for the Latin Grammy Award for Best Tropical Fusion Album category at its 19th edition in 2018.

Production 
For this album, Diego Gutiérrez chose among his songs the most representative of Cuban genres, which notably differentiates this work from his previous release De cero, more focused on a pop-rock sound. He also opted for the arrangements by a pianist with experience in Cuban salsa music, arranger and pianist of the popular Havana D'Primera orchestra. This would give his songs the peculiar flavor of native rhythms, mixed with his composition influenced by Nueva Trova and Contemporary Cuban Song.

This album won Cubadisco Award in the Best Fusion Album category in 2018.

After being nominated for the Latin Grammy Awards, Gutierrez has been able to present this album on tours throughout Cuba and several countries.

Track listing

Personnel 

 Lyrics, music and main voice in all songs: Diego Gutiérrez.
 Record producer: Tony Rodríguez and Diego Gutiérrez.
 Arrangements: Tony Rodriguez
 Piano and keyboards: Tony Rodríguez
 Electric bass: Yandy Martínez
 Electric guitar: Roberto Gómez
 Drums: Oliver Valdés
 Güiro: Oliver Valdés (Tracks 1, 2, 3, 5, 6, 8 and 9)
 Congas: Adel González
 Trumpet: Alejandro Delgado (Tracks 1, 2, 3, 5 and 10)
 Trombone: Amaury Pérez (Tracks 1, 3, 5 and 10)
 Saxophone: Jamil Scherry (Tracks 1, 3, 5 and 10)
 Backing vocals: Yosvel Bernal (Tracks 1, 2, 3, 5, 6, 8, 9, and 10)
 Backing vocals: Merlin Lorenzo (2, 3, 4, 5, 7, 8, 9 and 10)
 Programming and beat-making: José A. Blanco "El Negro WadPro" (Tracks 1, 3, and 10)
 Whistles: Tony Rodriguez (Track 6)
 Melodic: Tony Rodriguez (Track 9)
 Voice sample in "Filosofía de bar": Rolando Laserie
 Guest artist in "Contra la pared": Francis del Río
 Recording: Eng. Merlin Lorenzo and Eng. Daelsis Pena
 Post-production: Eng. Merlin Lorenzo
 Mixing: Eng. José Raúl Varona
 Mastering: Eng. Daelsis Pena
 Executive Producer: Brenda Besada
 Photo shoot: Ivan Soca Pascual
 Visual concept: Mario David Cárdenas

References

External links 

 Palante el Mambo! on Rate your Music
 Palante el Mambo! on Discogs

2018 albums
Spanish-language albums